Los Barón de Apodaca are a six-man Mexican cumbia band formed in 1978 in Apodaca, Nuevo León, Mexico. They have a long recording history with several compilations issued by EMI Latin America, and a 30 Aniversario album (2008).

Members 
 Javier Cantu – Guitar
 Efrain Flores – Bass
 Solomon Guajardo – Keyboard
 Juan Francisco Martinez – Drums
 Ubaldo Suárez – Lead vocals
 Arturo Valadez – Backing vocals

References

Cumbia
Mexican musical groups